Arthur Wood (24 January 1875 – 18 January 1953) was an English composer and conductor, particularly famous for "Barwick Green", the signature theme for the BBC Radio 4 series The Archers.

Life
Wood was born in Heckmondwike, Yorkshire, the son of a tailor. His father was a violinist in a local amateur orchestra and as a boy, Wood began to learn the violin, the flute and piccolo.

After his family moved to Harrogate in 1882 he was given flute lessons from Arthur Brookes, a member of a local spa orchestra. He left school at the age of twelve and two years later became organist of St Paul's Presbyterian Church in Harrogate. By age sixteen he had become the lead flautist, pianist and deputy conductor of the Harrogate Municipal Orchestra. Later he moved onto the Bournemouth Municipal Orchestra.

In 1903, at the age of twenty-eight, he progressed to become the director of music at Terry's Theatre, London. Wood conducted London theatre orchestras for over three decades, including the Apollo Theatre, the Shaftesbury Theatre, His Majesty's Theatre and the Theatre Royal, Drury Lane. He died in London on 18 January 1953.

He was father to Peggy Ann Wood, an actor, director and theatre manager based in Bristol.

Works
Wood was a prolific composer of works in a variety of categories, although he was self-taught in composition and orchestration. His first published work, the orchestral work Three Old Dances, was first published in 1902.

After this he became a staff composer for Boosey & Hawkes, for whom he wrote many orchestral suites and single works, many related to his upbringing. These include Three Dale Dances, the Yorkshire Moors Suite, A Lancashire Clog Dance and My Native Heath, from which his most famous piece "Barwick Green" came. Other orchestral works include his Concertino in A major, Widow Malone, An Oriental Scene and Fairy Dreams.

He also composed for a number of stage musicals, such as Yvonne, Petticoat Fair, and Fancy Fair, the latter two dating from about 1918.

Apart from "Barwick Green", his works are now rarely performed.

References

External links

1875 births
1953 deaths
20th-century classical composers
English classical composers
Light music composers
People from Heckmondwike
The Archers
English male classical composers
Musicians from Yorkshire
20th-century English composers
20th-century British male musicians